Probable G-protein coupled receptor 142 is a protein that in humans is encoded by the GPR142 gene.

GPR142 is a member of the rhodopsin family of G protein-coupled receptors (GPRs) (Fredriksson et al., 2003).[supplied by OMIM]

References

Further reading

G protein-coupled receptors